Marta Torrado de Castro (Valencia, Spain, 20 January 1966) is a Spanish politician who is member of the People's Party (PP).

Married, Torrado holds a degree in law. After serving in various roles within the Valencian regional administration she was elected to the Spanish Congress of Deputies in the 2008 election as the representative of the Valencia region. After being awarded the fifth place on the PP list, she was virtually guaranteed victory because her party consistently won at least five seats in elections since 1982.

External links
Biography at Spanish Congress website

References

Members of the 9th Congress of Deputies (Spain)
1966 births
Living people
People from Valencia
Politicians from the Valencian Community
People's Party (Spain) politicians
21st-century Spanish women politicians